The 1996 Iraqi coup d'état attempt was a coup d'état attempt against president Saddam Hussein and his regime, as part of a wave of attacks and assassination attempts on the president in Iraq. The attempt occurred in June 1996, when a failed coup plot against the government was planned by the United States according to Iraqi government.

See also
 Iraq War

References

Coup d'état attempt
Iraqi coup d'état attempt